The Indian Famine Codes, developed by the colonial British in the 1880s, were one of the earliest famine scales.

Types of Food insecurity 
The Famine Codes defined three levels of food insecurity: near-scarcity, scarcity, and famine.  "Scarcity" was defined as three successive years of crop failure, crop yields of one-third or one-half normal, and large populations in distress.  "Famine" further included a rise in food prices to above 140% of "normal", the movement of people in search of food, and widespread mortality.

Indian Famine Commission 
In order to address the issues of famine in India they created an Indian Famine commission to create ways to prevent and avoid future famine in India.  So in 1880, the secretary of commission wrote a draft of the Indian Famine Code. This famine code became the basis of famine prevention until the 1970s.  More famine codes were created after the Indian Famine Codes (Bihar) but they addressed similar ideas that the Indian one did, the Indian Famine code was the foundation of multiple famine codes/ scales. Famine codes and scales measure the intensity and magnitude of the famine. This famine code was one of the first attempts to predict famine, and by predicting it, prevent it.

The codes classified food scarcity on a scale of intensity and had steps that governments were required to take to mitigate the risk of famine.

References 

1880s in India
1880s in British India